Whitecaps FC Prospects was a Canadian soccer team based in Burnaby, British Columbia, Canada. Founded in 2008, the team played in Pacific Coast Soccer League (PCSL), a national amateur league at the fourth tier of the American Soccer Pyramid, which features teams from western Canada and the Pacific Northwest region of the United States.

The team played its home matches Terry Fox Field on the campus of Simon Fraser University, where they had played since 2008. The team's colours are blue and white.

The team was created following the Vancouver Whitecaps Residency team's move from the PCSL to the USL Premier Development League in 2008, and was an official part of the development system for the Vancouver Whitecaps FC Major League Soccer club.

Year-by-year

Head coaches
  Matt Holbrook (2008–2009)

Stadia
 Terry Fox Field at Simon Fraser University; Burnaby, British Columbia (2008–2009)

References

External links
Vancouver Whitecaps

2008 establishments in British Columbia
2009 disestablishments in British Columbia
Canadian reserve soccer teams
Pacific Coast Soccer League teams
Prospects
Association football clubs established in 2008
Association football clubs disestablished in 2009